St Mary's are a GAA club from Ardee, County Louth, Ireland. The club fields Gaelic football teams in competitions organized by Louth GAA.

History
The club was founded in 1928.

As of 2022, the club had competed in 28 Louth Senior Football Championship finals, winning 11.

Achievements
 Louth Senior Football Championship (11): 1946, 1948, 1951, 1955, 1956, 1960, 1968, 1972, 1975, 1995, 2022

Notable players
 Ronan Carroll
 Darren Clarke
 Dermot O'Brien

References

External links
 

Gaelic games clubs in County Louth
Gaelic football clubs in County Louth